So... How's Your Girl? is the debut studio album by Handsome Boy Modeling School. It was released on Tommy Boy Records on October 19, 1999.

Reception

At Metacritic, which assigns a weighted average score out of 100 to reviews from mainstream critics, So... How's Your Girl? received an average score of 79 out of 100 based on 13 reviews, indicating "generally favorable reviews".

It ranked at number 5 on Spins "Top 20 Albums of the Year" list.

Track listing
All songs produced by Dan the Automator and Prince Paul, except for "Waterworld" produced by Dan the Automator and "Holy Calamity (Bear Witness II)" produced by Dan the Automator, Prince Paul, and DJ Shadow.

Charts

References

External links
 

1999 debut albums
Prince Paul (producer) albums
Albums produced by Prince Paul (producer)
Albums produced by Dan the Automator
Albums produced by DJ Shadow
Handsome Boy Modeling School albums
Tommy Boy Records albums